Missulena dipsaca is a species of mygalomorph spiders in the family Actinopodidae. It is found in Australia.

References

dipsaca
Spiders described in 1995